Sironcha is a town and municipal council in Gadchiroli district of Maharashtra state in India. It connected with NH-63.

History
Historically, Sironcha was a key location for the East India Company from Nizam perspective, it was the Southern tehsil of Chanda District, Central Provinces. The population in 1891 of the area constituting the tahsil in 1908 was 51,732.

In 1908, Sironcha's headquarters were at Sironcha, the namesake village of 2,813 inhabitants,  from Chanda town by road. The northern portion of the tehsil comprised in the Ahiri zamindari was one of the most densely wooded and sparsely populated areas in the province; to the south of this, Sironcha extended in a long narrow strip to the east of the Godavari, and consisted of a belt of rich alluvial soil along the banks of the river and its affluents, with forests and hills in the background. The population is wholly Telugu.

Geography

There is a planned National highway No 16 between Nizamabad in Telangana State and Jagdalpur in Chhattisgarh State, Maharashtra and Telangana states.  The construction of this National highway includes building bridges over the Pranhita and Indravati rivers. Bridge construction on Pranhita River already completed which connects Mancherial district of Telangana to Sironcha tehsil of Gadchiroli District (Maharashtra). Also, Bridge construction on Godavari river completed which connects Kaleshwaram of Bhupalpally district to Sironcha Tehsil.The Tahasil is recently came into news for the discovery of Dinosaur's fossils and large numbers of wood fossils found dating back to crores of years, specially lower Jurassic period.

Climate

Demographics

Population
As of 2011 Indian Census, Sironcha had a total population of 7,427, of which 3,798 were males and 3,629 were females. Population within the age group of 0 to 6 years was 701. The total number of literates in Sironcha was 5,680, which constituted 76.5% of the population with male literacy of 82.4% and female literacy of 70.3%. The effective literacy rate of 7+ population of Sironcha was 84.4%, of which male literacy rate was 91.3% and female literacy rate was 77.3%. The Scheduled Castes and Scheduled Tribes population was 382 and 1,277 respectively. Sironcha had 1814 households in 2011.

Language
Majority of the population of Sironcha speaks Telugu (84.9%), followed by Marathi speakers (10.7%).

Transport
Sironcha town is connected by the State Road Transport ST services to Gadchiroli, Aheri, Chandrapur, Nagpur and Wardha. Sironcha is also connected to the Telangana State capital Hyderabad and some popular Cities/Towns like Bhupalpalle, Chinnur, Warangal, Manthani, Karimnagar, Godavarikhani, Hyderabad, Nellore and Mancherial. 

TSRTC Godavarikhani, Bhupalpalle and Mancherial bus depots runs services to this town. Good transportation service from Telangana state.

See also
Ganjiramayyapetha

References

Cities and towns in Gadchiroli district
Talukas in Maharashtra